Ojukwu David Ifegwu, also spelled as Ifeagwu Ojukwu David, is a Nigerian footballer who plays as a forward for Bangladesh Premier League club Chittagong Abahani. Before coming to Asia, he played in Nigeria Professional Football League, the top flight of Nigerian football.

Club career

Graduating from Westerlo Football Academy of his hometown Lagos, Ojukwu started his professional football career in Nigeria Professional Football League, the top-level league of Nigerian football.

On 23 October 2022, Bangladesh Premier League club Chittagong Abahani announced his signing. It was his first club outside his country. He scored on his debut for the club in a cup match. He scored five goals in the first phase of 2022–23 Bangladesh Premier League and jointly became sixth top scorer along with 2018 FIFA World Cup player Daniel Colindres.

References 

Nigerian footballers
Bangladesh Premier League
1996 births
Living people